Marcus Samuel Michael McGuane (born 2 February 1999) is an English professional footballer who plays as a central midfielder for Oxford United.

Club career

Arsenal
Born in Greenwich, London, McGuane is a product of Arsenal's Hale End Academy having joined at the under-6 level. He was the captain of the Arsenal under-18s and a regular for the under-23 side. On 28 September 2017, McGuane was named on the bench for Arsenal's UEFA Europa League match against BATE Borisov. He came on as a 79th-minute substitute for Reiss Nelson as Arsenal won 4–2.

Barcelona
On 30 January 2018, McGuane signed with FC Barcelona, being assigned to their B-team in the Spanish second tier. His buyout clause was set at €25 million. On 7 March 2018, McGuane played for the Barcelona first team in the Supercopa de Catalunya, coming on as a 77th-minute substitute for Aleix Vidal, and becoming the first English player to represent Barça in 29 years, after Gary Lineker. His team defeated RCD Espanyol on penalties after a goalless draw.

On 2 September 2019, McGuane joined Eerste Divisie side Telstar on a season-long loan deal.

Nottingham Forest
On 26 February 2020, McGuane returned to England with EFL Championship side Nottingham Forest on a two-and-a-half year deal, initially joining their Under-23s squad.

Oxford United
McGuane joined Oxford United on a season-long loan on 15 August 2020, making his league debut for the club on 12 September in a 2–0 defeat at Lincoln City.

On 6 May 2021, McGuane signed a three-year contract at the club, for an undisclosed fee.

International career
McGuane was eligible for both England and the Republic of Ireland at international level, qualifying for England through birth and the Republic of Ireland through his maternal grandparents who were born in Portlaoise and Cork. McGuane is also of Ghanaian descent.

McGuane represented the Republic of Ireland at the 2015 UEFA European Under-17 Championship, including an appearance against England on 13 May 2015.

However, in November 2015, McGuane made his first appearance for England under-17s against Germany, going on to appear for England at the 2016 UEFA European Under-17 Championship.

Career statistics

References

External links

Arsenal F.C. Profile
England profile at The Football Association

1999 births
Living people
Footballers from Greenwich
Association football midfielders
English footballers
England youth international footballers
English expatriate sportspeople in Spain
Expatriate footballers in Spain
Republic of Ireland association footballers
Republic of Ireland youth international footballers
Arsenal F.C. players
FC Barcelona Atlètic players
SC Telstar players
Nottingham Forest F.C. players
Oxford United F.C. players
Segunda División players
English people of Irish descent
English sportspeople of Ghanaian descent
Irish people of Ghanaian descent
Irish sportspeople of African descent
Black British sportsmen